Jajireddygudem Mandal also spell Jajireddigudem Mandal is one of the 23 mandals in Suryapet district of the Indian state of Telangana. It is under the administration of Suryapet revenue division with its headquarters at Jajireddigudem. It is bounded by Nuthankal mandal towards East, Suryapet mandal towards South, Nagaram mandal towards North, Yadadri district towards West.

Geography
It is in the 256 m elevation(altitude) .

Demographics
Jajireddygudem mandal is having population of 28,370. Jajireddygudem is the largest village and Velpucherla is the smallest village in the mandal.

Villages
 census of India, the mandal has 12 settlements. 
The settlements in the mandal are listed below:

Notes
(†) Mandal headquarter

References

Mandals in Suryapet district